Xenodens (from Greek and Latin for "strange tooth") is an extinct genus of marine lizard belonging to the mosasaur family. It currently contains a single species, X. calminechari (From Arabic کالمنشار, meaning "like a saw"), which is known from Late Maastrichtian phosphate deposits in the Ouled Abdoun Basin, Morocco. Its closest known relative is believed to be the durophagous Carinodens.

This is a feature that has never been seen in any other tetrapod but converge with the jaws of modern dogfish sharks and piranhas. Based on the feeding behavior of these animals, paleontologists believe that Xenodens used its highly specialized dentition for a broad diet on cephalopods, crustaceans, fish, and scavenged marine reptiles.

External links
This ancient sea reptile had a slicing bite like no other, Xenodens calminechari, with life-restoration. Science News, February 2, 2021
Xenodens, a weird shark-toothed mosasaur from Morocco- Nick Longrich
 Dinosaur-era sea lizard had teeth like a shark

References

Mosasaurines
Mosasaurs of Africa
Fossil taxa described in 2021